Pitts may refer to:

People
Allen Pitts, American born Canadian football player
Antony Pitts (1969), British composer
Boozer Pitts, American college football coach 
Byron Pitts, American reporter for CBS
Chester Pitts, American football player
Charles Pitts, American soul/blues guitarist
Chip Pitts, American attorney
Curtis Pitts, designer of a series of aerobatic biplanes
Denis Pitts, English journalist
Derrick Pitts, American astronomer
Earl Edwin Pitts, FBI agent and Soviet spy
Edmund L. Pitts, American lawyer and politician
Ernie Pitts, Canadian football player
Eve Pitts, British Anglican minister
Fountain E. Pitts (1808-1874), American Methodist minister and Confederate chaplain
Frank Pitts, American football player
George Pitts (disambiguation)
Helen Pitts (1838-1903), American suffragette and the second wife of Frederick Douglass
Jacob Pitts, American actor
James Pitts (disambiguation)
Jennifer Pitts, Miss Virginia 2005
Jesse R. Pitts, American author and educator
John Pitts, Catholic scholar and writer
John Michael Pitts, British composer
John Pitts (football player) (born 1945), American football defensive in the NFL
John E. Pitts, Jr., US Air Force brigadier general
Joseph R. Pitts, American politician from Pennsylvania 
Justin Pitts, American basketball player
Karnail "Bugz" Pitts, American rapper
Kyle Pitts (born 2000), American football player
Leonard Pitts, American journalist and the 2004 Pulitzer Prize winner 
Lillian Louisa Pitts (1872 – 1947), Australian photographer
Matthew Pitts, American television writer
Matthew Pitts, English football player
Mike Pitts, American football player
Milton Pitts, White House barber for Republican US presidents
Priscilla Pitts, New Zealand writer and art curator
Robert B. Pitts, first black HUD Regional Administrator, west coast region
R. C. Pitts, American basketball player
Rafi Pitts, Iranian film director
Riley L. Pitts, US Army captain
Ron Pitts, American sportscaster
Shirley Pitts (1934-1992), English fraudster and thief, the "Queen of shoplifters"
Tony Pitts, English actor
Trudy Pitts, soul jazz musician 
Valerie Pitts, British television presenter during the 1950s
Victória Pitts, Brazilian mezzo-soprano
Viola Pitts, American community activist from Fort Worth
Walter Pitts, American logician
ZaSu Pitts, American actress

Places
 Pitts, Georgia, United States
 Pittsburgh

Other
 The Pitts, an American television sitcom
 The Pitts Special, a light aerobatics biplane designed by Curtis Pitts
 Earl Pitts (character), a radio character created and voiced by Gary Burbank
 ZaSu Pitts Memorial Orchestra

See also

 Pits (disambiguation)
 Pitt (disambiguation)